Mats Löfström (born 27 October 1983 in Eckerö) is a Finnish politician representing Åland Centre. Löfström is the single member of parliament for the autonomous region of Åland in the Parliament of Finland. He was an Åland Centre party candidate to the Finnish Parliament on the Åland Coalition list at the 2015 Finnish parliamentary election. Löfström was elected, replacing Elisabeth Nauclér as the single representative of Åland in the Finnish Parliament. Löfström was re-elected in April 2019.

Löfström and his spouse Noora have been married since 2014.

References 

1983 births
Living people
People from Eckerö
Members of the Parliament of Finland (2015–19)
Members of the Parliament of Finland (2019–23)
Politicians from Åland